Anna Karenina is a 1985 American made-for-television romantic drama film based on the famous Leo Tolstoy 1877 novel Anna Karenina starring Jacqueline Bisset and Christopher Reeve and directed by Simon Langton. The film was broadcast on CBS on March 26, 1985.

Plot
Anna Karenina leaves her cold husband for the dashing Count Vronsky in 19th-century Russia.  An unfortunate series of events leaves her hopelessly depressed.

Cast
 Jacqueline Bisset as Anna Karenina
 Christopher Reeve as Count Aleksei Vronsky
 Paul Scofield as Aleksei Karenin
 Ian Ogilvy as Stiva
 Anna Massey as Betsy
 Joanna David as Dolly
 Judi Bowker as Kitty
 Valerie Lush
 Judy Campbell

Production notes
In his autobiography Still Me, actor Christopher Reeve claimed that while making this movie he learned how to ride a horse, then fell in love with them, which eventually led to his tragic riding accident 10 years later in 1995 when he fell from a horse and became paralyzed.

References

External links

1985 television films
1985 films
1985 romantic drama films
American romantic drama films
Films based on Anna Karenina
Films about infidelity
Romantic period films
Films shot in Hungary
CBS network films
Films directed by Simon Langton
American drama television films
1980s American films